Kindon is a rural locality in the Goondiwindi Region, Queensland, Australia.

Geography
The Gore Highway passes through from north-east (Bulli Creek) to south-west (Wyaga).

The southern part of the locality is within the Whetstone State Forest, but otherwise the predominant land use is farming.

History 
Kindon State School opened on 29 January 1963.

Education 
Kindon State School is a government primary (Prep-6) school for boys and girls at 14034 Gore Highway. In 2017, the school had an enrolment of 6 students with  2 teachers (1 full-time equivalent) and 4 non-teaching staff (1 full-time equivalent).

There is no secondary school in Kindon. The nearest are in Millmerran (to Year 10 only) and in Goondiwindi.

References 

Goondiwindi Region
Localities in Queensland